The Armenian Air Force is the air arm of the Armed Forces of Armenia formed by independent Armenia in 1992 in the wake of the dissolution of the Soviet Union. Outside its conventional name, it has also been referred to as the Aviation Department of the Armenian Armed Forces. It is organized and equipped principally to provide Armenian ground forces with tactical air support in the form of ground attack and airlift in mountainous terrain. It provided effective support during the battles with Azerbaijan in the Nagorno-Karabakh region from 1992 to 1994.

Since 2003, the Armenian government has been funding a modernization and enlargement of the air fleet. The Armenian Air Force sports the Armenak Khanperyants Military Aviation University.

History

First Nagorno-Karabakh War
Although Armenia began taking over Soviet weapons shortly following the collapse of the USSR in 1991, it would not be until October 1992 that its nascent air force was able to conduct offensive combat operations. The first Armenian combat loss was suffered on 12 November 1992, when an Mi-24 gunship operating in support of the Armenians' Martuni Offensive was shot down near the village of Kazakh. On 23 November, two Mi-8 transports were hit by ground fire, downing one and seriously damaging another; another Mi-8 was lost on 30 December.

The Azeris initiated a new offensive on 1 January 1993, successfully cutting the Lachin corridor the following day and isolating Armenian forces in Nagorno-Karabakh from resupply from Armenia proper. The Armenian Air Force helped bring up reinforcements for a counterattack that began 7 January. The first day of this action, the Armenian Air Force suffered its worst single-day losses with an Mi-8, Mi-24 and a (possibly Russian) Su-25 shot down; the Su-25 may have been brought down by friendly fire. By the time the Azeri attack had been defeated at the end of the month, another three helicopters and possibly another fighter – reportedly a MiG-21 (and therefore probably Russian) – were lost.

In late March 1993, the Armenians kicked off a new offensive in the north aimed at opening a second supply route from Armenia. Operation Kelbajar involved a four-prong attack which was successful in routing Azerbaijan's 2nd Army Corps and securing control of the region. Armenian Air Force losses for amounted to one Mi-8 helicopter (on 16 April). No aircraft losses were suffered during the subsequent summer offensives of 1993 or in the next year's actions preceding the ceasefire of 16 May 1994.

Although Armenia began working to establish an independent Armenian armed forces as early as 1989, due to a lack of resources, suitably trained personnel and useful infrastructure, the government delayed formally creating an air force until August 1992, and commenced combat operations in October. However, this may not represent the first use of armed aircraft by the Armenians; an Azeri report states that the Armenians allegedly used modified civilian Mi-8 helicopters for bombing civilian targets in the Geranboi region of Azerbaijan in January 1990. The Azeris also claimed Armenian Mi-24 attack helicopters were employed in support of an assault on Shusha in February 1992. Azerbaijani helicopter gunships were also used in fighting in the region.

Establishment of an air force 
In January 1992, the General Directorate of Aviation and Air Defense Forces was created as part of the newly created Ministry of Defense of Armenia. In 1992, by order of Minister of Defense Vazgen Sargsyan, the aviation department was separated from the air defense department and became a separate structure, with a separate aviation units and subunits being created. In subsequent years, in parallel with the stages of army construction, various programs for the development and improvement of the air force were implemented. As a result of the reorganization and restructuring of the DOSAAF flying club and the "Arzni" airport and their transfer in 1992 to the Ministry of Defense, the Aviation Training Center was founded. According to its December 1992 declaration for the Treaty on Conventional Armed Forces in Europe, Armenia had inherited only three operational combat aircraft and at least 13 armed helicopters from the former Soviet Union, along with a portion of its air defense network. The armed helicopter came from the former 7th Guards Helicopter Regiment and were taken over in 1991. The identities of the three combat aircraft are uncertain, but may have included one MiG-25 interceptor and two Su-25 ground-attack aircraft, probably from the former Soviet 80th Fighter-Bomber Aviation Regiment at Sitalçay air base in Azerbaijan; the helicopter force comprised Mi-8 transport and Mi-24 attack versions that had been based near Yerevan, Armenia. Other aircraft reportedly taken over by the Armenians in 1991 include six An-2, one An-24 and one An-32 transports, as well as ten Yak-52 trainers.

Territorial conflicts with Azerbaijan instigated a major expansion of Armenia's air and air defense forces in 1993–1994. The bulk of Armenia's aviation-related investment, however, went to greatly strengthening the Armenian Air Defense organization. With Russian technical assistance and contributions of anti-aircraft weapons and equipment, within a year Armenia was able to integrate most of the Soviet radars and surface-to-air missiles (SAMs) left in its territory into a coherent and effective air defense system, which it officially declared operational in April 1994. Aircraft additions were few, but by the end of 1994 the Armenian Air Force's inventory had reached an estimated 5–6 operational Su-25s (one has long been non-operational) and possibly one MiG-25 combat aircraft; two L-39 and ten Yak-52 trainers; six An-2, two An-72, one Tu-134, one Tu-154 transport aircraft; and two Mi-2, seven Mi-8/Mi-17, 15 Mi-24 helicopters.

21st century 
The Armenian Air Force experienced a major expansion and modernization in 2004–2005. It tripled its fixed-wing combat arm through the procurement of ten surplus Su-25 from Slovakia for a total of US$1 million in August 2004. These twenty-year-old aircraft – which had not been flown for a decade and required work to re-certify their flightworthiness – were delivered in September 2005. The Su-25 receipt was also originally mis-reported as an acquisition of ten Su-27 air superiority fighters, an aircraft the Slovak Air Force never operated. Also in 2004, Armenia received a pair of L-39C trainers from each of Russia and the Ukraine, as well as two Il-76 transports from Russia in May.

Recently, there have been unverified reports that Armenia received up to ten Su-27s from Russia in 2006. This may have been presaged by an Azeri source which reported in October 2005 that Armenia had bought "10 fighter jets", but that, according to Azeri military sources, only 2-3 of the aircraft were Su-27s; the remainder were purportedly Su-25 jets and Mi-24 attack helicopters. Ostensibly, these would have been procured on preferential terms under the provisions of the 2002 Collective Security Treaty Organization (CSTO) agreement. To date, however, there has been no confirmation of the receipt of any of these aircraft, and it is possible that any appearance of Su-27s in Armenia may have been a deployment of Russia's own aircraft to its airbase at Yerevan. (It has also been pointed out that the Soviets never based Su-27s in Transcaucasia because it was too difficult an environment for them to operate in.  Armenia's small size limits operational maneuver room and makes it difficult for them to climb to sufficient altitude.)

In January 2016, Armenian Defense Minister Seyran Ohanyan mentioned that Russia had discussed the possibility of supplying Su-30 fighters to Armenia during a four-day Russian-Armenian intergovernmental commission on bilateral military-technical cooperation. Armenia has ordered four Su-30SMs in February 2019, with deliveries expected to begin in 2020. The country plans to acquire additional Su-30SM aircraft, according to the Armenian Defense Minister David Tonoyan. On 27 December 2019, Armenia has received all four aircraft ahead of schedule. In August 2020, negotiations were under way to acquire a new batch of Su-30SM fighters, according to Armenian Defense Minister David Tonoyan. In March 2021, Nikol Pashinyan, Prime Minister of Armenia, confirmed that Armenia bought Su-30SM fighters without missiles package from Russia.

Organization
Little information has been made public about the Armenian Air Force's organization. It is known that the Air Force operates within a joint Air and Air Defense Force structure, and in 2004 the Air Force comprised four functional units:

 121st Ground Attack Aviation Squadron (Gyumri Aviation Military Unit), based at Gyumri
 15th Mixed Aviation Regiment, a composite helicopter squadron based at Yerevan
 60th Aviation Training Squadron, a training center at Arzni.

Airbases
Armenia's main airbases are located at Erebuni Airport in Yerevan and Shirak Airport in Gyumri, with the addition of a training base at Arzni Airport.

Air Defense Force
The Air Defence Force is part of the Armenian Air Force. It was equipped and organized as part of the military reform program of Ter-Grigoriants. Armenian Air Defence forces comprise an anti-aircraft missile brigade and two regiments armed with 100 missile launchers of mostly Soviet and now Russian manufacture. The previous commander of the Russian Air Force, General Vladimir Mikhaylov, said:"On the one hand, Armenia’s national system of air defence makes us happy", [he said]. "On the other, we will keep helping you, including with means and forces existing at the Russian military base No. 102 which is stationed here".In 1992, the Air Defense Department is established by the order of the Minister of Defense. At the time, about 400 non-commissioned officers were drafted. At the same time, light anti-aircraft defense units were formed in the motorized rifle regiments and brigades, which later turned into batteries and divisions.

Personnel
In the summer of 1993, the Armenian Air Force had a personnel strength of 2,000; this had grown to 3,000 by 2004. Originally dependent on small numbers of returning experienced Armenian military personnel, reservists, conscripts, and contract foreign nationals, during 1993–1994 Armenia established its own military institutions from scratch, among which were its own aviation vocational institute at Yerevan and related training facilities. It remains reliant on conscripts, who serve for 24 months, but also employs volunteers on a contract basis with terms of 3–15 years.

Pilots and technical personnel begin their training at the Military Aviation Institute in Yerevan, which was established in 1993. Pilot candidates undertake a basic and primary flying training course which includes 80 hours on the Yak-52 and is followed by 60 hours of jet conversion and advanced training on the L-39. In 2005, the facility also operated a single Yak-18 aerobatic trainer for drop training of paratroopers. A pair of Mi-2 helicopters were also kept available for training helicopter air crews. Type conversion and advanced tactical training are conducted at operational units.

International cooperation 
Armenian and Russian air and air defense forces are closely integrated. To help redress its relative military weaknesses compared to Azerbaijan and Turkey, on 16 March 1995 Armenia signed a treaty with Russia giving the latter a 25-year-long military presence in Armenia. A follow-on agreement defining terms and conditions was signed 27 September 1996 which authorized the establishment of Russian aviation bases at Gyumri and Yerevan. Russian aviation forces in Armenia comprise 18 MiG-29 fighters of the 426th Fighter Squadron and the 700th Air Traffic Control Center, both at the 3624th Air Base at Erebuni Airport outside Yerevan. Russian MiG-29s arrived in four separate batches: five on 16 December 1998, five on 26 February 1999, four more on 18 June and the final four on 22 October 1999. This serial deployment of Russian aircraft to their Armenian base was initially misinterpreted as deliveries to the Armenian Air Force. The Russian MiG-29s may have supplanted an earlier deployment of MiG-23 fighters, as there have been unconfirmed reports of the latter being in service around that time, with the combined number of MiG-23s and MiG-29s at Yerevan possibly reaching as many as 30 aircraft. (There have also been unsubstantiated rumors of Armenian MiG-23 receipts.)

The Armenian Air Force participates in the CSTO's annual air defense exercises.

Commanders
General Stepan Galstyan (2003-2009)
Major General Avetik Muradyan (until March 2019)

Equipment

Aircraft 
In February 2019, Armenia contracted to purchase 4 Su-30SM fighters for $100 million without missiles package. The aircraft were built by the Irkutsk Aviation Factory and were delivered in late December 2019. These Su-30 were left unused in the 2020 Nagorno-Karabakh war as a result of the purchase of aircraft without missiles.

Air Defense

Accidents and Incidents 

 4 November 2008: An Armenian Air Force Mi-24 attack helicopter crashed as it was preparing for a training flight, killing pilot Captain Arshak Nersisyan. 
12 November 2014: 2014 Armenian Mil Mi-24 shootdown
15 May 2017: 9K33 Osa of Armenian short-range air defence system was destroyed by Azerbaijani Armed Forces on Khojavand-Fizuli direction in Karabakh.
 4 December 2018: An Armenian Air Force Su-25UBK two-seater trainer crashed near the town of Maralik in the Shirak region of Armenia, killing both pilots, Lieutenant Colonel Armen Babayan and Major Movses Manukyan.
 29 September 2020: during the 2020 Nagorno-Karabakh conflict an Armenian Su-25 was allegedly shot down by a Turkish F-16, showing the pictures of the crash site. Turkish and Azerbaijani governments denied the Armenian claim, saying that two Armenian Su-25 crashed due to non combat related causes.

See also
Armenian Army
Military history of Armenia
1958 C-130 shootdown incident

References

 
Military units and formations established in 1992